Amita Sharma (born 12 September 1982) is an Indian former cricketer who played primarily as a right-arm medium-fast bowler. She appeared in five Test matches, 116 One Day Internationals and 41 Twenty20 Internationals for India between 2002 and 2014. She played domestic cricket for Railways, Assam and Delhi.

Sharma first played for India in 2002, and soon established herself as an integral member of the side. She took 14 wickets in the 2005 World Cup in South Africa and helped her side into the final.

In 2012, in a WODI against England, Sharma and Gouher Sultana scored 58 for the 10th wicket, which at the time was a record in WODI history.

References

External links
 
 

Living people
1982 births
Cricketers from Delhi
Indian women cricketers
India women Test cricketers
India women One Day International cricketers
India women Twenty20 International cricketers
Railways women cricketers
Assam women cricketers
Delhi women cricketers